Richard Waldron may refer to:

 Major Richard Waldron (1615–1689), second president of colonial New Hampshire (or Richard Waldron I)
 Richard Waldron (colonel) (1650–1730), prominent officeholder in colonial New Hampshire (or Richard Waldron II)
 Richard Waldron (Secretary) (1694–1753), leading opponent of the Wentworth oligarchy in colonial New Hampshire (or Richard Waldron III)
 Richard Russell Waldron (1803–1846), purser and special agent to the Wilkes Expedition (great-grandson of Richard Waldron (Secretary))